The HD postcode area, also known as the Huddersfield postcode area, is a group of nine postcode districts in England, within three post towns. These cover southern West Yorkshire, including Huddersfield and Holmfirth in the Metropolitan Borough of Kirklees, and Brighouse in the Metropolitan Borough of Calderdale.



Coverage
The approximate coverage of the postcode districts:

|-
! HD1
| HUDDERSFIELD
| Huddersfield Town Centre, Hillhouse, Lockwood, Marsh, Paddock.
| Kirklees
|-
! HD2
| HUDDERSFIELD
| Birkby, Brackenhall, Bradley, Deighton, Fartown, Fixby, Sheepridge.
| Kirklees
|-
! HD3
| HUDDERSFIELD
| Lindley, Longwood, Marsh, Milnsbridge, Oakes, Outlane, Quarmby, Paddock, Salendine Nook, Scammonden, .
| Kirklees
|-
! HD4
| HUDDERSFIELD
| Berry Brow, Cowlersley, Crosland Moor, Farnley Tyas, Netherton, Newsome, Lowerhouses, Stocksmoor.
| Kirklees
|-
! HD5
| HUDDERSFIELD
| Almondbury, Dalton, Kirkheaton, Moldgreen, Rawthorpe, Waterloo.
| Kirklees
|-
! HD6
| BRIGHOUSE
| Bailiff Bridge, Brighouse, Clifton, Rastrick, . 
| Calderdale
|-
! HD7
| HUDDERSFIELD
| Golcar, Linthwaite, Marsden, Scapegoat Hill, Slaithwaite.
| Kirklees
|-
! HD8
| HUDDERSFIELD
| Clayton West, Denby Dale, Emley, Fenay Bridge, Kirkburton, Lepton, Scissett, Shelley, Shepley, Skelmanthorpe, Birdsedge
| Kirklees
|-
! HD9
| HOLMFIRTH
| Brockholes, Hepworth, Holme, Holmfirth, Honley, Meltham, Scholes, Upperthong, Wooldale.
| Kirklees
|}

Map

See also
Postcode Address File
List of postcode areas in the United Kingdom

References

External links
Royal Mail's Postcode Address File
A quick introduction to Royal Mail's Postcode Address File (PAF)

Kirklees
Calderdale
Postcode areas covering Yorkshire and the Humber